Dorival Caymmi (April 30, 1914 – August 16, 2008) was a Brazilian singer, songwriter, actor, and painter active for more than 70 years, beginning in 1933. He contributed to the birth of Brazil's bossa nova movement, and several of his samba pieces, such as "Samba da Minha Terra", "Doralice" and "Saudade da Bahia", have become staples of música popular brasileira. Equally notable are his ballads celebrating the fishermen and women of Bahia, including "Promessa de Pescador", "O Que É Que a Baiana Tem?", and "Milagre". Caymmi composed about 100 songs in his lifetime, and many of his works are now considered to be Brazilian classics. Both Brazilian and non-Brazilian musicians have covered his songs.

Ben Ratliff of The New York Times wrote that Caymmi was "perhaps second only to Antônio Carlos Jobim in 'establishing a songbook of [the 20th] century's Brazilian identity.'" Throughout his career, his music about the people and culture of Bahia influenced Brazil's image in the eyes of both Brazilians and foreigners. Caymmi was married to Brazilian singer Stella Maris for 68 years, and the couple's children, Dori, Danilo, and Nana, are also prominent musicians. Each debuted professionally by accompanying Caymmi onstage and in recordings. In 2014, Caymmi's granddaughter Alice also began a musical career.

Early life
Caymmi was born in Salvador, Bahia, to Durval Henrique Caymmi, the great-grandson of an Italian immigrant, and Aurelina Soares Caymmi, a native Bahian. He had two younger sisters, Dinahir and Dinah, and a younger brother, Deraldo. His father, a civil servant, often played the piano, guitar, and mandolin at home, and his mother, a housewife, sang regularly. He participated in his church's choir for much of his childhood. At age 13, he left school to work as a journalist at Bahian newspaper O Imparcial. When O Imparcial went out of business two years later, he took up work as a street vendor.

Although he never formally studied music, Caymmi taught himself to play guitar in the late 1920s and began to compose, sing, and play his own songs on Bahian radio programs around 1930. He first achieved widespread recognition in 1933, when he composed the song "O Que É Que a Baiana Tem?" ("What Is It About Bahian Women?") for singer Carmen Miranda. In 1936, at age 22, he won a songwriting contest at Salvador's annual Carnaval celebration. His prize was a pink satin lampshade. Despite his early musical success, he moved to Rio de Janeiro in 1938 with intentions to pursue a law degree and to return to working as a journalist. While employed there by the newspaper Diários Associados, he spent his spare time composing and singing songs on the radio show Dragão da Rua Larga. His popularity began to grow with the show's audience.

Career

Overview

Many of Caymmi's lyrics pay homage to the lifestyle, beaches, fishermen, and women of his native Bahia. He drew much of his inspiration from music indigenous to northeastern Brazil, especially Afro-Brazilian music and samba. He recorded for more than five decades and released about 20 albums, sometimes singing and playing guitar as a soloist and at other times accompanied by bands and orchestras. Although active for the better part of the 20th century, Caymmi wrote only about 100 songs. Despite having a relatively small body of work, Caymmi held a reputation for composing songs of exceptional quality. He occasionally collaborated with Jobim, who called him a "universal genius" and Brazil's greatest composer. Many contemporary Brazilian artists, including Caetano Veloso, Gilberto Gil and Beth Carvalho cite Caymmi as a significant influence on their music.

Chronology

"O Que É Que a Baiana Tem?" gained even more fame in Brazil when Miranda performed it in the 1939 film Banana da Terra, and it was this song that garnered her international attention and helped launch her career. After this success, Caymmi began to focus more on making music, and he wrote songs that appeared in other Brazilian films. In late 1939, he signed with Odeon Records and recorded his first three singles, "Rainha do Mar/Promessa de Pescador" ("Queen of the Sea/Promise of the Fisherman"), "Roda Pião" ("Spinning Wheel"), and "O Que É Que a Baiana Tem?/A Preta do Acarajé" ("What Is It About Bahian Women?/The Black Beauty Who Sells Acarajé"). He came to more attention in the early 1940s when he performed as a regular on the Brazilian radio network Rádio Nacional. He recorded "Samba da Minha Terra" ("Samba of My Homeland") in 1940 and "A Jangada Voltou Só" ("The Raft Returned Alone") in the following year. In 1944, he performed his own "Acontece Que Eu Sou Baiano" ("It Just So Happens That I'm Bahian") in the movie Abacaxi Azul (Blue Pineapple). In the late 1940s, he was a member of the samba-canção movement largely founded by his sometime creative rival, composer Ary Barroso. Other prominent Brazilian musicians of the day covered several of his songs, including Dick Farney, who famously recorded Caymmi's "Marina" (1944) in 1947. In 1957 Caymmi wrote "Suíte do Pescador", which appeared in the film The Sandpit Generals.

In the 1950s and 1960s, Jobim, João Gilberto, and others who contributed to the birth of the bossa nova style collaborated with Caymmi and often referenced his work when composing their own pieces. During this era, Gilberto covered several of Caymmi's songs, including "Rosa Morena" ("Dark-skinned Rose") and "Saudade da Bahia" ("Longing for Bahia"). Jobim was particularly enamored of Caymmi's music, and the two grew to be close friends. American lyricist Ray Gilbert translated Caymmi's "Das Rosas" into English in 1965, and it was released in the United States as "...and Roses and Roses". The song was recorded by Brazilian vocalist Astrud Gilberto and by American singers Andy Williams and Perry Como. Williams's version became a hit, and as a result, Caymmi was invited to spend four months in Los Angeles, where he performed, filmed a television show, and recorded an LP record.

Collaboration with Jorge Amado

Caymmi was a lifelong friend of Bahian author Jorge Amado, and in 1945, he set one of Amado's politically driven poems to music to aid the senatorial campaign of Luís Carlos Prestes. In the late 1970s, Caymmi again took inspiration from Amado when he composed "Modinha para a Gabriela" ("A Little Song for Gabriela"), a musical adaptation of Amado's novel Gabriela, Cravo e Canela (Gabriela, Cloves and Cinnamon). Perhaps the best known product of Caymmi and Amado's collaboration is the song "É Doce Morrer no Mar" ("It's Sweet to Die in the Sea"), which the two wrote over dinner one night at Amado's home. Other songs they co-wrote include "Beijos pela Noite" ("Kisses Through the Night"), "Modinha para Teresa Batista" ("A Little Song for Teresa Batista"), "Retirantes" ("Migrants"), and "Essa Nega Fulô" ("This Feisty Dark Lady").

Awards and honors
In 1968, to thank Caymmi for bringing international attention to Brazilian music and culture, the governor of Bahia presented Caymmi with a house in Salvador, and so he returned to live in his hometown for a short period of time. In 1972, Caymmi was awarded the Order of Merit of the State of Bahia, an order given to Bahian residents for excellent service to the state. In Caymmi's case, the service was bringing pride and honor to Bahian people through the widespread dissemination of his music about life there. On Caymmi's 70th birthday, in 1984, French Minister of Culture Jack Lang presented him with the Ordre des Arts et des Lettres, a French order that recognizes significant contributors to the fields of art and literature, in Paris. The following year, a new street named Avenida Dorival Caymmi (Dorival Caymmi Avenue) opened in Salvador. In 1986, Rio de Janeiro's famed Mangueira samba school based its Carnaval performance on Caymmi's life and work, and the school won the annual parade-style samba competition. In 2015, his tribute album Centenário Caymmi (Caymmi Centennial) was nominated for Best MPB Album at the 16th Annual Latin Grammy Awards.

Personal life

Although Caymmi earned his fame through music, he was also known to a lesser degree for his paintings. From 1943 to 1945, he regularly attended a drawing and painting class at the Escola de Belas Artes, a fine arts school in Rio de Janeiro. Even after discontinuing his formal study, he painted for the rest of his life. He practiced Candomblé, an Afro-Brazilian religion characterized by belief in spirit-gods and ritualistic practices involving mediumship. Candomblé was his father's religion, and Caymmi gradually involved himself more with it as an adult, when his friends invited him to accompany them to religious ceremonies and parties. Caymmi was also a naturist, and when he was in Bahia, he liked to bathe nude in the Lagoa do Abaeté (Abaeté Lagoon) with a group of friends. He stated to the newspaper Valor Econômico: "We rolled around in palm leaves and slipped through the mountains of sand. Some people didn't like this, but most understood that we weren't naked for unclean reasons."

Marriage

While working at Rádio Nacional in 1939, he met Brazilian vocalist Adelaide Tostes, who is better known by her stage name Stella Maris, and the two married in 1940. Tostes responded to a 1994 press query about Caymmi's habit of frequenting bars with a short story: "One night I went to look for him in a bar ... He was surrounded by women. I went in and slammed a table. A glass broke. The bouncer came, and I punched Caymmi's face. Then I left cussing. I thought he was involved with drugs, but it wasn't the case. He was with the tramps." Despite such incidents, however, they remained together for 68 years, until his death in 2008. The couple had three children, Nana, Dori, and Danilo, all of whom followed their father into musical careers.

Politics
Although Caymmi rarely incorporated political messages into his music, he often spoke bitterly about the government's corruption. Jorge Amado, his close friend, was sent into exile for several years after he publicly criticized the country's rulers during the period of military dictatorship. In 1994, Caymmi said, "I have concluded that to act as a citizen in Brazil today is to live a joke. It's the same as playing the lotto, dreaming about nonsense, trying to get rich when you are 80."

Death
Dorival Caymmi died at age 94 of kidney cancer and multiple organ failure on August 16, 2008, at his home in Copacabana, Rio de Janeiro. His granddaughter, Stella, who wrote a biography about him in 2001, said, "He did not know that he had cancer, and he did not want to know. He did not ask much about this. He was first hospitalized in 1999. My grandfather went through with treatment, but he did not want to know anything about the illness. He acted with serenity every day, and because of that, we respected this wish."

Reception and legacy

Brazilian singer and composer Carlos Lyra praised Caymmi's style for its "suave and romantic colloquialism". In a 1994 anthology of Caymmi's work, Antônio Carlos Jobim wrote in the introduction, "Dorival is a universal genius. He picked up the guitar and orchestrated the world." In 2001, New York Times journalist Ben Ratliff wrote that Caymmi was "perhaps second only to Antônio Carlos Jobim in 'establishing a songbook of this century's Brazilian identity.'" On the day of Caymmi's death in 2008, Brazilian composer and musician Tom Zé said, "It's difficult to comprehend just how valuable a CD of Caymmi's beach songs from the 1940s is." Also around the time of Caymmi's death, President of Brazil Luiz Inácio Lula da Silva called him "one of the founders of Brazilian popular music". Several of Caymmi's contemporaries, including Gal Costa and Olivia Hime, have recorded tributes to him.

Discography

Albums
Prior to 1988, all of Caymmi's albums were released as LP records. His last four albums were released as CDs.

Singles
All of Caymmi's singles were released as 78 rpm gramophone records.

Tributes

References

External links

 
 Caymmi's obituary in The New York Times

1914 births
2008 deaths
Bossa nova singers
Brazilian people of Italian descent
Deaths from kidney cancer
Deaths from multiple organ failure
People from Salvador, Bahia
Dorival
Samba musicians
Brazilian Candomblés
Deaths from cancer in Rio de Janeiro (state)
20th-century Brazilian painters
20th-century Brazilian male artists
20th-century Brazilian male singers
20th-century Brazilian singers
Male jazz musicians